The 2011 Indonesian Masters Grand Prix Gold (officially known as the Bankaltim Indonesia Open GP Gold 2011 for sponsorship reasons) was an international badminton tournament held in Samarinda, East Kalimantan, Indonesia from September 27, 2011 - October 2, 2011.

Men's singles

Seeds

Finals

Top half

Section 1

Section 2

Section 3

Section 4

Bottom half

Section 5

Section 6

Section 7

Section 8

Women's singles

Seeds

Finals

Top half

Section 1

Section 2

Bottom half

Section 3

Section 4

Men's doubles

Seeds

Finals

Top half

Section 1

Section 2

Bottom half

Section 3

Section 4

Women's doubles

Seeds

Finals

Top half

Section 1

Section 2

Bottom half

Section 3

Section 4

Mixed doubles

Seeds

Finals

Top half

Section 1

Section 2

Bottom half

Section 3

Section 4

References

Indonesian Masters (badminton)
Indonesia
Indonesia Open Grand Prix Gold
Sport in East Kalimantan